Alejandro Alvarado Jr. (born July 29, 2003) is an American professional soccer player who plays as a midfielder for F.C. Vizela in the Primeira Liga.

Club career

LA Galaxy II
Alvarado made his league debut for the club on July 20, 2020, coming on as an 88th-minute substitute for Omar Ontiveros in a 1-0 away victory over the San Diego Loyal.

Personal life
Born in the United States, Alvarado is of Mexican descent.

Career statistics

Club

Honors
United States U20
CONCACAF U-20 Championship: 2022

References

External links
Alejandro Alvarado Jr. at US Soccer Development Academy

2003 births
Living people
Soccer players from Los Angeles
American soccer players
American sportspeople of Mexican descent
LA Galaxy II players
F.C. Vizela players
USL Championship players
Primeira Liga players
Association football midfielders
United States men's under-20 international soccer players